Bianka is a feminine given name in Hungarian,Russian, Polish, Slovak and German.

People with this name
 Bianka (singer) (born 1985), Russian and Belarusian singer
 Bianka Buša (born 1994), Serbian volleyball player
 Bianka Lamade (born 1982), German tennis player
 Bianka Panova (born 1970), Bulgarian gymnast
 Bianka Schwede (born 1953), German rower
 Bianka Munoz (born 2007), American musician

See also
Bianca, a feminine given name
Blanka (given name), a feminine given name
Blanca (given name), a feminine given name
Branca, a feminine given name
Branka, a feminine given name

References

German feminine given names
Polish feminine given names
Hungarian feminine given names